Parliamentary elections were held in Austria on 9 October 1994. The Social Democratic Party of Austria (SPÖ) and Austrian People's Party (ÖVP) remained the largest parties, but both suffered losses to minor parties. The Freedom Party of Austria (FPÖ) improved to 22.5% and The Greens won 7.3%. The Liberal Forum, a liberal splinter from the FPÖ, won 6.0% and entered the National Council on its first attempt. The incumbent grand coalition of the SPÖ and ÖVP was renewed.

Contesting parties
The table below lists parties represented in the 18th National Council.

Results

References

Elections in Austria
Austria
Legislative
Austria